The 2007 Speedway Grand Prix of Scandinavia was the seventh race of the 2007 Speedway Grand Prix season. It took place on 11 August in the G&B Stadium in Målilla, Sweden.

Starting positions draw 
The Speedway Grand Prix Commission has nominated Fredrik Lindgren (as wild card), Jonas Davidsson and Sebastian Aldén (both as track reserve). Peter Karlsson and Kai Laukkanen has replace the injured Andreas Jonsson and Jarosław Hampel.

(7) Matej Žagar (Slovenia)
(1) Jason Crump (Australia)
(8) Tomasz Gollob (Poland)
(16) Fredrik Lindgren (Sweden)
(5) Leigh Adams (Australia)
(11) Scott Nicholls (United Kingdom)
(12) Bjarne Pedersen (Denmark)
(6) Hans N. Andersen (Denmark)
(10) Antonio Lindbäck (Sweden)
(14) Rune Holta (Poland)
(9) Jarosław Hampel (Poland) → (20) Kai Laukkanen (Finland)
(3) Nicki Pedersen (Denmark)
(4) Andreas Jonsson (Sweden) → (19) Peter Karlssonn (Sweden)
(13) Wiesław Jaguś (Poland)
(2) Greg Hancock (United States)
(15) Chris Harris (United Kingdom)
(17) Jonas Davidsson (Sweden)
(18) Sebastian Aldén (Sweden)

Heat details

Heat after heat 
 Gollob, Crump, Lindgren, Žagar
 Andersen, Adams, Nicholls, B.Pedersen
 N.Pedersen, Laukkanen, Lindbäck, Holta
 Karlsson, Jaguś, Hancock, Harris
 Adams, Lindbäck, Karlsson, Žagar
 Jaguś, Crump, Nicholls, Holta
 Gollob, Hancock, B.Pedersen, Laukkanen
 N.Pedersen, Harris, Andersen, Lindgren
 Harris, Žagar, Nicholls, Laukkanen (F/X)
 N.Pedersen, Adams, Crump, Hancock
 Jaguś, Gollob, Andersen, Lindbäck
 Lindgren, B.Pedersen, Holta, Karlsson
 N.Pedersen, B.Pedersen, Jaguś, Žagar
 Andersen, Crump, Karlsson, Laukkanen (E4)
 Gollob, Adams, Holta, Harris
 Nicholls, Hancock, Lindgren, Lindbäck
 Holta, Andersen, Žagar, Hancock
 Crump, B.Pedersen, Harris, Lindbäck
 N.Pedersen, Gollob, Nicholls, Karlsson
 Jaguś, Lindgren, Adams, Laukkanen Semi-Finals:
 Crump, Andersen, N.Pedersen, Lindgren (F/X)
 Adams, Gollob, Nicholls, Jaguś  Final:
 Adams (6), Gollob (4), Crump (2), Andersen (0)

The intermediate classification

See also 
 List of Speedway Grand Prix riders

References 

Sc
2007
2007 in Swedish motorsport